Galleon is a 2004 action-adventure game developed by Confounding Factor and published by SCi Games and Atlus for the Xbox. Designed by Toby Gard as his first independent project after leaving Core Design, the game was announced in 1997, but suffered several delays and changes in the consoles it would be released to. It was released in Europe on June 11, 2004, and in North America on August 3 to mixed reviews from critics. A mobile spin-off entitled Galleon: Dawn was released on August 26, 2004.

Plot

Rhama Sabrier has received a letter from Dr. Areliano, stating that he is fascinated about his ship and its origins, and wants Rhama to come help investigate this situation. Arriving at dock, Rhama is introduced by Dr. Areliano's servant, Jabez. He is in quite a hurry, as he is aware that Areliano would be back soon, however Rhama would like to visit the shop, as he is low on stock.

Jabez notices that Rhama's ship is behind his, so he consumes another herb, starting a massive storm. While trying to help steer the ship, Rhama falls off. He manoeuvres through the water so that he isn't blown away by the wind. Eventually, Rhama arrives at land, exhausted.

Development
Announced in Edge in 1997, the game went through various incarnations and publishers. The designer of Lara Croft, Toby Gard left Core Design shortly after the character's first game, Tomb Raider, was released. Galleon was to be his first independent title following Tomb Raider. Galleon started development on PC and moved to Dreamcast, then GameCube (as Galleon: Islands of Mystery) and eventually to the Xbox. The title was originally going to be published by Interplay but after numerous delays was cancelled and subsequently picked up by SCi. Gard's company Confounding Factor closed its doors after the release and he returned to Eidos Interactive as a design consultant for the Tomb Raider franchise. The graphical style of the game was intended to have a comic book feel as well as being influenced by Ray Harryhausen's Sinbad films and Burt Lancaster vehicles. The soundtrack was originally composed by Lee Nicklen, and has since been made available for free.

Reception

Galleon: Islands of Mystery received "average" reviews  according to video game review aggregator Metacritic.

References

External links
Official website

2004 video games
Action-adventure games
Atlus games
Cancelled Dreamcast games
Cancelled GameCube games
Cancelled PlayStation (console) games
Video games about pirates
Video games developed in the United Kingdom
Video games featuring female protagonists
Video games set on fictional islands
Xbox games
Xbox-only games